Ierna (d. 547) was a Berber tribal leader of the Laguatan and also high priest of the god Gurzil who was active in the praetorian prefecture of Africa during the Moorish Wars of the mid-sixth century. Apparently he led the Laguatan at the Battle of Cilium in 544, when the Byzantine governor Solomon was killed and many Byzantine soldiers were captured.

In the winter of 546/547, he served as second-in-command in the army of Antalas, another tribal leader in revolt. He fought in the battle that caused the Berber defeat before the troops of John Troglita. This defeat near Suffetula at the beginning of 547 resulted in: the submission of Antalas, the fleeing of Ierna with the image of Gurzil, being later captured and killed, and the image destroyed. Carcasan succeeded him in power.

References

Sources 

 

6th-century Berber people
547 deaths
Berber rebels